The Battle of Güstow, also known as the Battle of Tornow, was a battle during the Pomeranian War in the Seven Years' War fought between Prussia and Sweden near the village Güstow in Germany on 18 November 1758. The battle ended with a Prussian victory.

References

Säwe, Teofron, Sweden's participation in the Seven Years' War Years 1757-1762, p. 221, Stockholm, 1915
Schantz, Gustaf von, Try a history over the last Pomeranian War, p. 50, Stockholm, 1811

Conflicts in 1758
Battles of the Seven Years' War
Battles involving Prussia
Battles involving Sweden
Battles in Brandenburg
1758 in the Holy Roman Empire